Clarence W. Smith (October 19, 1855 – June 24, 1937) was an American lawyer, judge, and politician from New York.

Life 
Smith was born on October 19, 1855 in Jay, New York, the son of Eli Smith, a blacksmith, and Mary Atwood.

Smith initially worked as an assistant for his father. He became a teacher when he was 19, and then attended the academy in Elizabethtown. In 1877, he began attending University of Michigan Law School. He graduated from there with an LL.B. and was admitted to the Michigan bar in 1879. After a trip west he returned to Jay. In 1882, he moved to Wells and taught school. After reading law under T. D. Trumbull of Jay, he was admitted to the New York bar in 1883. A few months later, he was elected county judge. After his term as judge expired in 1890, he moved to Johnstown and practiced law with Philip Keck.

In 1901, Smith was elected to the New York State Assembly as a Republican, representing Fulton and Hamilton Counties. He served in the Assembly in 1902 and 1903. He was elected mayor of Johnstown from 1914 to 1915 and again from 1918 to 1919. He also served as city attorney for many years, retiring in 1930 at the age of 75.

In 1881, Smith married Cora Bruce of Jay. They had one daughter, Mrs. Marion McDonald. He was a member of the Freemasons and the Independent Order of Odd Fellows.

While living with his sister Sarah Fletcher in Bloomingdale, Smith suffered a stroke. His daughter Marion then brought him to her home in Mount Stewart, Prince Edward Island, Canada where he lived for the last several weeks of his life. He died at Marion's home there on June 24, 1937. He was buried in the Central Cemetery in Jay.

References

External links 

 The Political Graveyard
 Clarence W. Smith at Find a Grave

1855 births
1937 deaths
People from Jay, New York
University of Michigan Law School alumni
Michigan lawyers
New York (state) state court judges
19th-century American lawyers
20th-century American lawyers
People from Hamilton County, New York
19th-century American judges
20th-century American politicians
Republican Party members of the New York State Assembly
Mayors of places in New York (state)
People from Johnstown, New York
American Freemasons
Burials in New York (state)